The Ahlul Bayt Digital Library Project (Ahlul Bayt DILP), established in 1996, is a non-profit Islamic organization that features work from a group of volunteers operating throughout the world. It operates the website Al-Islam.org – whose primary objective is to digitize and present quality resources related to the history, law, and society of the Islamic religion and its personalities – with particular emphasis on the Twelver Shi'ah Islamic school of thought. Al-Islam.org is a site that also serves as a means of introducing Islam to non-Muslims.

Aims
The Ahlul Bayt DILP aims to encourage the research of Islam and to facilitate the propagation of knowledge to locations where such resources are not commonly or easily accessible. To cater to this objective, the Ahlul Bayt DILP is constantly expanding its digital library, which consists of over 4000 resources accessible for free. The Ahlul Bayt DILP states that it also aims:

History
Since its launch, Al-islam.org has proven to be one of the most authentic sources of Shi'a Islam information, and is notable for being the top site in Yahoo!'s list of Shia sites by popularity.

Organization
The organization is a 501(c)(3) public charity, and is made up of volunteers who contribute articles and/or digitized materials. The DILP and the Al-Islam.org site are supported by individual donors and well-wishers.

Ongoing projects
On-route to achieve a vast library with the best resource of Islamic knowledge, the Ahlul Bayt DILP team is currently working on various important projects.

Digital library
The free digital library consists of more than 800 resources in different languages. To further accommodate its users, the Ahlul Bayt DILP team has been working on various projects which give detailed information on a specific topic. Such projects include the Shiite Encyclopedia, the Event of Gadeer Khum project, and Tahrif (distortion) of Islamic texts.

While the majority of texts currently available in the library are English translations, the DILP volunteers have taken up the task of providing texts in other languages like Spanish, Italian, Swahili, Arabic, Urdu and Gujarati.

The digital library also includes full texts of Islamic books, written by both scholars and laymen. While it does not hold the actual copyrights on these digitized texts, permission from the copyright holders was taken in order to allow DILP and its volunteers to rectify material in terms of spelling, grammar, etc.

Sections of the digital library 
The digital library is divided into different sections, which include:
 Belief & Creed
 Education & Society
 Quran & Hadith
 History & Politics
 Spirituality & Philosophy
 Laws & Worship

Multimedia gallery
The multimedia section of Al-islam.org has a large collection of audio/video resources. These are mainly Quran recitations, lectures, elegies, and supplications. It also has a picture gallery consisting of images of Islamic calligraphy and many important Islamic sites.

The Multilingual Quran
The Multilingual Quran section of the DILP is a searchable Quran with English translation as well as commentary from Agha Puya/S.V. Mir Ahmed Ali.  It also includes multiple translations, and browsing by root-words and topics.

Journal archives
This contains archived articles from scholarly journals such as Al-Seerat, Al-Tawheed, and Al-Thaqalayn.

The Event of Ghadir Khum project
This is a scholarly examination of the event where the Prophet Muhammad appointed Imam Ali as his successor. The study focuses on examining the chain of narrators and the tradition of Al-Ghadir.

Islam in a Nutshell
This is a set of fact sheets, ready for distribution, which are available in numerous languages including Albanian, Bosnian, German, Swedish, and Thai.

Alif-Bot
This is an informative Islamic robot which can give basic information about Islam.

Islam Supplication Browser
This is a multilingual collection of Ad’iya and Ziaraat, categorized by source and date.

See also
The Aalulbayt (a.s.) Global Information Center

References

External links

archived and part of the Minerva project of the Library of Congress
Middle East Virtual Library Ahlul Bayt Digital Islamic Library Project (DILP)

Shia organizations
Islamic libraries
American digital libraries
Shia Islamic websites
Shia literature